NGC 5634 is a globular cluster in the constellation Virgo (constellation), located about 82,200 light years (25.2 kiloparsecs) away. NGC 5634 has an apparent magnitude of about 10 and a diameter of 4 or 5 arcminutes. Its Shapley–Sawyer Concentration Class is IV, meaning the cluster shows intermediate rich concentrations. The star near the upper right is the eleventh-magnitude UCAC2 29844847. There is also a bright orange giant, HD 127119, about 1.3 arcminutes away from the cluster.

NGC 5634 was once likely a member of the Sagittarius Dwarf Spheroidal Galaxy. The galaxy itself is being pulled apart by tidal forces from the Milky Way, similar to how NGC 5634 was pulled from the Dwarf Spheroidal Galaxy.

References

External links
 
 NGC 5634

Globular clusters
Virgo (constellation)
5634